North Ruthenian or Northern Ruthenian may refer to:

 something or someone related to northern regions of Ruthenia (those regions are now belonging to the modern Belarus)
 northern varieties of the Ruthenian language (those varieties evolved into the modern Belarusian language)

See also
 Ruthenia (disambiguation)
 Ruthenian (disambiguation)